The 3rd Dallas-Fort Worth Film Critics Association Awards honored best filmmaking of 1993.

Winners
Best Actor:
Liam Neeson - Schindler's List
Best Actress:
Holly Hunter - The Piano
Best Director
Steven Spielberg - Schindler's List
Best Film:
Schindler's List
Best Supporting Actor:
Ralph Fiennes - Schindler's List

References

External links
Dallas-Fort Worth Film Critics Association official website

1993
1993 film awards